was a Japanese samurai of the late Edo period, who served as a retainer of the Aizu domain. He is notable for his service as a senior officer under Hijikata Toshizo at the Battle of Utsunomiya Castle. While he survived the Boshin War, the details of his death are unknown.

Akizuki's grave is at Kōtoku-ji, in Aizuwakamatsu.

References
 Short biography of Akizuki (3 Oct. 2007)
 Another Akizuki biography (Archived 2009-10-24) (3 Oct. 2007)
 Picture of Akizuki's Grave (3 Oct. 2007)

Samurai
Meiji Restoration
1842 births
1885 deaths
People from Aizu